Folinella is a genus of minute sea snails, pyramidellid gastropod mollusks or micromollusks in the family Pyramidellidae within the tribe Chrysallidini.

Description
The whorls of the teleoconch are sculptured similarly throughout. The axial ribs are rounded. The spiral markings consist of two tumid ridges, one at the periphery and one at the summit of the whorls; with many striations on the base.

Species
 Folinella acupicta Peñas & Rolán, 2017
 Folinella anguliferens (de Folin, 1873)
 Folinella binilicia Peñas & Rolán, 2017
 Folinella excavata (Phillippi, 1836)
 Folinella ghisottii van Aartsen, 1984
 Folinella holthuisi van Aartsen, Gittenberger E. & Goud, 1998
 Folinella moolenbeeki van Aartsen, Gittenberger E. & Goud, 1998
Species  brought into synonymy
 Folinella maoria (Powell, 1940): synonym of Ividella maoria Powell, 1940
 Folinella navisa (Dall & Bartsch, 1907): synonym of Chrysallida navisa (Dall & Bartsch, 1907)
 Folinella quinquecincta (Carpenter, 1856): synonym of Ividella quinquecincta (Carpenter, 1857)
 Folinella robertsoni (Altena, 1975): synonym of Iolaea robertsoni (van Regteren Altena, 1975)

References

 Pimenta, Alexandre D., f. N. Santos, and Ricardo S. Absalão. 2008. Review of the genera Ividia, Folinella, Menestho, Pseudoscilla, Tryptichus and Peristichia (Gastropoda, Pyramidellidae) from Brazil, with descriptions of four new species. The Veliger 50: 171-184.
 Peñas A. & Rolán E. (2017). Deep water Pyramidelloidea from the central and South Pacific. The tribe Chrysallidini. ECIMAT (Estación de Ciencias Mariñas de Toralla), Universidade de Vigo. 412 pp.

External links
 To WoRMS
 Dall W.H. & Bartsch P. (1904). Synopsis of the genera, subgenera and sections of the family Pyramidellidae. Proceedings of the Biological Society of Washington. 17: 1-16

Gastropod genera
Pyramidellidae